The Polonus Philatelic Society is a society of stamp collectors who specialize in the postage stamps and postal history of Poland.

Location

The members of the Polonus Philatelic Society are located throughout the USA and in several foreign countries. The society may be contacted via mail sent to: Polonus Philatelic Society, P.O. Box 60438, Rossford, Ohio, 43460-0438.

Charter

The Polonus Philatelic Society is a 501 (c)(3)not-for-profit organization incorporated in 1939 in the state of Illinois. The Society is organized exclusively for educational purposes with the objective of promoting Polish philately through the dissemination of information in the English language.

Polish philately

The society’s interests cover all aspects of Polish postage stamps and stamped covers.

Study groups
Current study groups within the society center on:
 POW Camps
 DP/Intern Camps
 Aero-Philately
 Cinderellas and Labels
 World War I

Quarterly bulletin
The society issues a quarterly “Bulletin of the Polonus Philatelic Society” in the English language.

See also 
 Fischer catalog
 Postage stamps and postal history of Poland
 Polonus Philatelic Society

Philatelic organizations based in the United States
Philately of Poland